The Saskatchewan Federation of Labour (SFL) is the Saskatchewan provincial trade union federation of the Canadian Labour Congress. Founded in 1956, it has a membership of 98,000. The primary function of the SFL is to lobby branches of Canadian government on behalf of the unions the SFL represents.

References

External links
 

Canadian Labour Congress
Provincial federations of labour (Canada)
Trade unions established in 1956